Acacia evenulosa is a shrub belonging to the genus Acacia and the subgenus Phyllodineae native to Western Australia.

The phyllodes are erect with a narrowly oblong to linear shape that is straight to shallowly incurved and often biconvex. It produces yellow flowers from August to September.

The species was first formally described by the botanist Bruce Maslin in 1999 as part of the work Acacia miscellany 16. The taxonomy of fifty-five species of Acacia, primarily Western Australian, in section Phyllodineae (Leguminosae: Mimosoideae) as published in the journal Nuytsia. The species was reclassified in 2003 as Racosperma evenulosum by Leslie Pedley and transferred back to the genus Acacia in 2006.

It is endemic to an area in the Goldfields-Esperance, Wheatbelt and Great Southern regions of Western Australia where it is found on flats and undulating plains growing in sandy, clay, loamy or gravelly soils.

See also
 List of Acacia species

References

evenulosa
Acacias of Western Australia
Plants described in 1999
Taxa named by Bruce Maslin